Mascoutah Community Unit School District #19 is a school district headquartered in Mascoutah, Illinois, United States.

The district serves Mascoutah and some unincorporated areas in St. Clair County, including Scott Air Force Base.  The district also serves some parts of Belleville, Illinois such as The Orchards.  The district has three elementary schools which provide Kindergarten through 5th grade, a middle school that provides 6th through 8th grades, and a high school for 9th through 12th grades.

Schools

Secondary schools
 Mascoutah Community High School (Mascoutah)
 Mascoutah Middle School (Mascoutah)

Elementary schools
 Mascoutah Elementary School (Mascoutah)
 Scott Elementary School (Unincorporated area, On Scott Air Force Base)
 Wingate Elementsry School (Belleville)

References

External links
 

School districts in Illinois
Education in St. Clair County, Illinois